The Battle of Cut Knife, fought on May 2, 1885, occurred when a flying column of mounted police, militia, and Canadian army regular army units attacked a Cree and Assiniboine teepee settlement near Battleford, Saskatchewan. First Nations fighters forced the Canadian forces to retreat, with losses on both sides.

Background

In the spring of 1885, the Métis living in the District of Saskatchewan formed a provisional government under Louis Riel, taking control of the area around Batoche. Riel was in contact with First Nations people in Saskatchewan and Alberta, such as the Cree and Assiniboine. The government was concerned that the resistance would spread to First Nations across the North-West Territories.

The Government of Canada quickly made preparations to send troops to crush the Resistance.

Bands of Cree, assembled under the leadership of Poundmaker, went to Battleford. The purpose of the visit was to lobby the Indian agent there, Mr. Rae, for better supplies (many members of the band were starving) and to discuss the political situation. The people of Battleford and some of the settlers in the surrounding area, hearing reports of large numbers of Cree and Assiniboine leaving reserves and making their way to Battleford, feared for their safety. On the night of March 30, 1885, townspeople began to abandon the town and seek shelter in North-West Mounted Police Fort Battleford. When Poundmaker and his party reached the town, Rae refused to come out of the fort to meet with them. He kept them waiting for two days. Poundmaker's people meanwhile suffered from hunger, having been refused supplies by Rae.

The abandoned homes and businesses were looted about this time. The identity of the looters is disputed. Some reports claimed Poundmaker's people were responsible, but one observer alleged that most of the looting had already been done by whites. Oral history accounts claim that the looting was done by Nakoda people, and that Poundmaker did his best to stop it. Either way, Poundmaker's people left the next day.

Meanwhile, bands of Assiniboine living south of Battleford had heard about the Métis' rebellion. A small group of them killed a local farmer who had treated them harshly, and shot their Indian agent for beating a teenage girl. They then went north to Battleford to meet up with Poundmaker. A number of homes and businesses in Battleford were then looted and burned. There is some controversy as to who was responsible and as to the extent of the destruction.

The Canadian government sent Major-General Frederick Middleton to Saskatchewan to crush the Métis' rebellion. The small police force at Fort Battleford, suddenly responsible for the safety of nearly 500 civilians, called on him for reinforcements and hastily set about forming a home guard to garrison the post. Middleton detached a column under the leadership of Lieutenant-Colonel William Otter to relieve Battleford.

Otter's column consisted of some 763 men from the 2nd Battalion, "Queen's Own Rifles of Canada", 'B' Battery, Regiment of Canadian Artillery, 'C' Company of the Infantry School Corps, a party of sharpshooters from the 1st Battalion Governor General's Foot Guards, a small party of North-West Mounted Police under the command of Percy Neale, and assorted teamsters. The column travelled by rail to Swift Current, setting out on the march for Battleford on April 13 and arriving on April 24. When Otter arrived, he found hundreds of civilians, white and Métis, crammed into the fort. However, Poundmaker's followers were nowhere to be found. Overjoyed at Otter's arrival, the townspeople and settlers wanted revenge on the Indians for the losses in lives and material that they had suffered. Many of Otter's troops, inexperienced militiamen, were angry that they had "missed out on a fight".

Pressured by the townspeople and his own troops, Otter decided to take action. Despite orders from General Middleton to stay in Battleford, he wired the Lieutenant-Governor of the Northwest Territories (who was also the Indian Commissioner), Edgar Dewdney, for permission to "punish Poundmaker." Permission was granted. A garrison was left in Battleford, while he led a flying column of 392 men to attack the Cree and Assiniboine at Cut Knife Hill. His force was made up of 75 North-West Mounted Police (cavalry), several small units of Canadian army regulars, and various volunteers and militia. He carried with him two 7-pounder field rifles and a Gatling gun. He set out on the afternoon of May 1. His plan was to march until dusk, rest until the moon rose, then continue on to attack the Cree and Assiniboine early in the morning, while they were asleep.

Meanwhile, the Cree were encamped on their reserve west of Battleford, on Cut Knife Creek. They were joined by various other bands, including Assiniboine. They knew that there were thousands of Canadian soldiers in the area to fight the Métis' rebellion and decided to protect themselves. As was Cree custom, the war chief Fine Day replaced Poundmaker (the 'political chief') as leader until the fighting was over. The entire encampment was moved across Cut Knife Creek to the west side. Behind the camp was Cut Knife Hill, and on both sides of it were ravines filled with bushes and trees. Altogether, nine bands of Cree and three of Assiniboine were present, numbering some 1500 men, women, and children.

Battle
Just after dawn on May 2, Otter's column arrived. Otter had expected that the camp would be in the prairie on the east side of Cut Knife Creek. He had not anticipated that he would have to ford the creek. After his column had crossed the creek, they had to wade through a marsh before they reached the encampment. An old Cree man named Jacob with Long Hair had woken up when he heard the sound of the soldiers crossing the creek, and he alerted the camp. Colonel Otter set up two cannons and a Gatling gun and started firing on the camp. In the first few minutes, there was total confusion. The gunfire broke lodges and destroyed the camp. Women and children went running for the safety of the ravines. A group of Assiniboine warriors charged Otter's men to stop them from killing the women and children. The other warriors moved into the ravines, and Fine Day went to the top of Cut Knife Hill to direct the Cree counterattack. The warriors fought in small groups. One group would run forward, attack the soldiers, then rush back to the ravine before the soldiers could get them. As soon as the soldiers tried to attack the warriors on one side, another group of warriors would rush out of the second ravine and attack them from behind. The other warriors guarded the women and children. Otter could not attack, because he had no idea where the enemy were nor of their numbers. Robert Jefferson, an eyewitness reports that "not more than 50 [Natives] altogether, had taken part in the battle. This was understandable since few were armed."  Douglas Light's research indicates some 243 Cree and Assiniboine men were present, and notes that a number of young boys also took part in the fight.

Otter formed his men into a wedge. Two lines of soldiers and police faced the two ravines. The volunteers and militia guarded the rear, facing the marsh. As the battle continued, Fine Day employed a flanking maneuver, whereby his warriors began to move along the two ravines, getting closer and closer to the soldiers. The warriors stayed behind trees and bushes while they fired, so that Otter's men could not see anyone to shoot at. Colonel Otter's soldiers were almost encircled: on the left and right were the ravines and behind them, the way out was made difficult by the marsh.

After six hours of fighting, Otter decided to withdraw. As the soldiers crossed the marsh, some of Poundmaker's fighters mounted their horses to continue the attack. Poundmaker asked them to let Otter's men leave. They respected Poundmaker and allowed Otter to retreat to Battleford without attack. Some historians believe only Poundmaker's actions prevented an outright slaughter of Otter's troops.

Note: The Encyclopedia of Saskatchewan describes the terrain and initial encounter somewhat differently.

Maps
Military Map of Cut Knife Battlefield
Military Map of Cut Knife 1
Military Map of Cut Knife 2

Names of Dead
Among the deaths among the government forces were:
John Rogers and William B. Osgoode, members of the Guards Company of Sharpshooters (Ottawa)
Corporal W. H. T. Lowry, NWMP

Conclusion
The Battle of Cut Knife was the natives' most successful battle during the North-West Rebellion. They had the advantage of being on their own territory, but also several disadvantages: they were outnumbered, attacked by surprise, and short on ammunition. Fourteen of Otter's soldiers were wounded, and eight killed, including one abandoned to be mutilated by native women; three natives were wounded and five killed, including a Nez Perce who had come north from the United States some years earlier.

The battle instilled in some of Otter's men a respect for their enemy. Otter had expected Poundmaker's people to be caught off-guard and demoralized and to surrender quickly. But that had not happened.

However, despite suffering their greatest reverse during the campaign, sheer weight of numbers and better supplies favoured the North-West Field Force. In just a few weeks, the starving Cree went to Battleford to make peace with Major-General Middleton. Fine Day, the Cree war chief who had directed the battle, escaped to the United States. Poundmaker was arrested and jailed for seven months. Lieutenant-Colonel William Otter survived the battle and remained a prominent figure in the military, commanding The Royal Canadian Regiment in the Boer War, and acting as Director of Internment Camps in World War I.

Many people have compared this battle to the Battle of the Little Bighorn. There are some major similarities: in both cases, an army officer disobeyed orders; both tried to catch a native camp by surprise; both Custer and Otter badly misjudged the terrain and had to slow down their attacks; and both ended up being surrounded by warriors and had no idea where to charge. Otter, at least, knew when to retreat (and was allowed to do so), while Custer kept fighting and suffered hundreds of casualties. Of course, the battles were very different in their outcome. Whereas Custer himself was killed along with a third of his soldiers, Otter and most of his soldiers survived their battle and emerged with a new respect for native warriors.

Legacy

The site of the battle was designated a National Historic Site of Canada in 1923.

A bronze statue at Cartier Square Drill Hall in Ottawa, Ontario is dedicated to William B. Osgoode and John Rogers, members of the local Guards Company of Sharp-Shooters who were killed during the Battle of Cutknife Hill.

In the spring of 2008, Tourism, Parks, Culture and Sport Minister Christine Tell proclaimed in Duck Lake, that "the 125th commemoration, in 2010, of the 1885 Northwest Resistance is an excellent opportunity to tell the story of the prairie Métis and First Nations peoples' struggle with Government forces and how it has shaped Canada today."

At Cut Knife is the world's largest tomahawk, the Poundmaker Historical Centre and the Big Bear monument.  There is also now, correctly located, a cairn erected by the Historic Sites and Monuments Board of Canada upon Cut Knife Hill overlooking the Poundmaker Battle site and Battle River valley.

A government announcement in early May 2019 stated that the Chief Poundmaker, who had been convicted of treason-felony, would be exonerated by Prime Minister Justin Trudeau and that a formal apology would be made on 23 May 2019.

See also
Battle of Frenchman's Butte
North-West Rebellion

References

Conflicts in 1885
1885 in Canada
Battles of the North-West Rebellion
Military history of Saskatchewan
National Historic Sites in Saskatchewan
Canadian Register of Historic Places in Saskatchewan
History of Indigenous peoples in Canada
May 1885 events